The Helpmann Award for Best Ballet or Dance Work was a dance award presented by Live Performance Australia at the annual Helpmann Awards from 2001 to 2016. The Helpmann Awards are Australia's national awards for live performance.

From 2017, the award was superseded by separate Helpmann award categories for Best Ballet and Best Dance Production.

Indigenous contemporary dance company Bangarra Dance Theatre received the award six times, and The Australian Ballet won it four times.

Winners and nominees

Source:

See also
 Dance in Australia

References

External links
The official Helpmann Awards website

B
Dance awards
Dance in Australia